Silk City Diners was a division of the Paterson Wagon Company, later known at Paterson Vehicle Company, established by Everett Abbott Cooper and based in Paterson, New Jersey, which produced about 1,500 diners from 1926 until 1966. Each was tagged with the year and order in which it was built; for example, 5607 would be the seventh diner manufactured in 1956. Several have been listed on the National Register of Historic Places (NRHP).

NRHP  and other extant diners
1941 Silk City, Gilmore Car Museum, Hickory Corners, MI
The Diner, Horseheads, New York
Fezz's Diner, Coudersport, Pennsylvania
Miss Albany Diner
Roadside Diner, Wall, New Jersey
Village Diner, Red Hook, New York
Kims Classic Diner Sabina, Ohio
Deligan's Diner (formerly the Blue Tone Diner), Silk City #4824. Formerly in Peekskill , NY; now in private hands in Massachusetts.
Silk City Diner, Lounge, and Garden, Philadelphia, Pennsylvania
Tic Tock Diner, Clifton, New Jersey
 Delta Diner, Delta, Wisconsin
 Biscuits and Barbecue, Mineola, NY
 Park Dinor, Lawrence Park, Pennsylvania
Baby's Burgers & Shakes, State College, Pennsylvania
Country Girl Diner, Chester, Vermont 
 Doyle's, Selbyville, Delaware

See also
 Fodero Dining Car Company
 Jerry O'Mahony Diner Company
 Kullman Dining Car Company
 Mountain View Diners Company
 Worcester Lunch Car Company

References

External links
 Diner Hunter: Silk City Diner Tags
 Pinterest: Silk City Diners
 Tom's Diner: Silk City Diner

Diner manufacturers
Defunct companies based in New Jersey
Companies based in Passaic County, New Jersey
Paterson, New Jersey